Gremaud is a surname. Notable people with the surname include: 

Mathilde Gremaud (born 2000), Swiss freestyle skier
Olivier Gremaud (born 1979), Swiss rower

French-language surnames